Erythrolamprus poecilogyrus is a species of snake in the family Colubridae. The species is found in Argentina, Uruguay, Brazil, Venezuela, Bolivia, Guyana, Paraguay, and Peru.

References

Erythrolamprus
Reptiles of Argentina
Reptiles of Venezuela
Reptiles of Peru
Reptiles described in 1824
Taxa named by Prince Maximilian of Wied-Neuwied